

The Albastar Apis WR is a single seater sailplane of Slovenian manufacture, the first aircraft created entirely by this manufacturer, Albastar Ltd. An Ultralight Class glider, it has set five world records in this class.

Often confused with the very similar Wezel Apis 2, the two designs are not related.

It is sold by Albastar ready-to-fly or kit-built.

Specifications

References

2000s Slovenian sailplanes
Glider aircraft
Albastar Ltd aircraft